Leucas is a genus of plants in the family Lamiaceae.

Leucas may also refer to an English transliteration of the ancient Greek place name Leukas (Λευκάς) and places bearing that name: 
 Lefkada or Lefkas, Greece
 Abila Lysaniou, also Leucas, ancient city of Syria